Park House is at 37–41 Lower Bridge Street, Chester, Cheshire, England.  It is recorded in the National Heritage List for England as a designated Grade II listed building.

History

Park House was built in about 1717 as a town house for Elizabeth Booth. It was extended in the late 18th century, and in 1818 was converted into a hotel named the Albion Hotel. The gardens closed in 1865 when the Grosvenor Park was being developed, and working-class terraced houses were built on the site. At some time the name of the hotel was changed to the Talbot Hotel. The house later became used as a library, and later as a licensed premises and shop. Alterations were carried out in the 20th century.

Architecture

The building is constructed in brick that is rendered on the front.  It has stone dressings and a grey slate roof. The architectural style is Georgian.  The building is in three storeys with a semi-basement; it is symmetrical with five bays.  The central bay contains a projecting porch with Tuscan columns. Seven steps lead up to the main entrance.  Four steps go down to the north semi-basement, and two to the south semi-basement.  At the sides of the building are rusticated quoins.  Each bay on all storeys contains a sash window.  The interior includes a ballroom.

See also

Grade II listed buildings in Chester (central)

References

Houses completed in 1717
Park House
Grade II listed buildings in Chester
Grade II listed houses
Georgian architecture in Cheshire
1717 establishments in England